Aristotelia nesiotatos is a moth of the family Gelechiidae. It was described by Kyu-Tek Park in 2014. It is found in Korea, where it has been recorded from the island of Yeonpyeongdo.

The wingspan is about 8.5  mm. The forewings are densely speckled with dark-brown scales throughout and with an orange–white sub-basal fascia. The antemedian fascia is arched, arising from the median level of the cell and extends to the dorsum. There are also several other irregular orange-white spots.

Etymology
The species name is derived from the Greek nesos (meaning island) with the Greek superlative ending -tatos.

References

Moths described in 2014
Aristotelia (moth)
Moths of Asia